Kasturi or Kasthuri may refer to:

 Deer musk, known as kasturi
 Musk, meaning of kasturi in some Indian languages
 Kasturi (TV series), a Hindi soap opera
 Kasthuri (TV series), a Tamil soap opera
 Kasthuri TV, a 24-hour Kannada-language television channel
 Kasthuri (magazine), a monthly family magazine in Kannada language
 Kasturi (1980 film), a 1980 Hindi film directed by Bimal Dutta
 Kasturi class frigate, a ship class of the Royal Malaysian Navy

People 
 Kasturi Chellaraja Wilson, a Sri Lankan business personality
 Kasturi Pattanaik (born 1966), an Indian classical dancer
 Hang Kasturi, a legendary warrior represented on the coat of arms of Malacca, Malaysia
 Kasthuri (actress), an Indian actress
 Kasthuri Raja, an Indian film director
 Kasturi Ranga Iyengar (1859–1923), an Indian lawyer, freedom fighter, politician and journalist